The Comeau Building is a historic U.S. building in West Palm Beach, Florida. It is located at 319 Clematis Street. On September 6, 1996, it was added to the U.S. National Register of Historic Places.

References

External links

 Comeau Building at Florida's Office of Cultural and Historical Programs

National Register of Historic Places in Palm Beach County, Florida